Ariel Oliva Querubin is a retired Philippine Marine Corps officer and a recipient of the Philippines' highest military award for courage, the Medal of Valor.

Early life and education
Querubin was born in Dagupan, Pangasinan. He grew up in La Union and studied in Manila. He was a member of the leftist student group Samahang Demokratiko ng Kabataan ("Democratic Association of Youth") until he attended the Philippine Military Academy, graduating in 1979. He then opted to become an officer in the Philippine Marine Corps.

Military career
Querubin has been an active participant in various military operations during the ongoing Communist rebellion in the Philippines and the Moro conflict. He is credited with the neutralization of various rebel leaders of both the Communist Party of the Philippines-New People's Army and the Moro National Liberation Front, including CPP-NPA provincial chairman Jessie Rafael in 1981, four MNLF commanders in 1983, the NPA commander known as "Ka Ninong" and MNLF commander Racquel Carreon, both in 1988. He is also said to have been involved in the rescue of Hans Kunzli, a Swiss national kidnapped by a group led by a former member of the Moro National Liberation Front.

Participation in the 1987 coup attempt

On 28 August 1987, Reform the Armed Forces Movement rebels led by Gregorio Honasan attempted a coup against President Corazon Aquino. They attacked Malacañang Palace, Camp Aguinaldo and Villamor Air Base. Querubin, along with Red Kapunan and Juancho Sabban, attempted to bring Philippine Military Academy cadets from Baguio to Manila to provide support for Honasan.

Participation in the 1989 coup attempt

In 1989, then-Captain Querubin was a co-founder of the Young Officers' Union (YOU). The YOU, along with another group known as the "Soldiers of the Filipino People" (SFP) and the Reform the Armed Forces Movement (RAM) participated in the most serious coup against Corazon Aquino's government. He almost died in clashes with troops loyal to the government. Some reports indicate that he suffered from a gunshot wound; Querubin himself stated that he was wounded by a rocket blast during clashes in Camp Aguinaldo. The mutiny eventually failed and Querubin and his comrades were detained. They were granted amnesty during the administration of Fidel Ramos, who succeeded Corazon Aquino as president.

Re-entry into military service
Querubin re-entered military service after being granted amnesty. In 1994, he was credited with the neutralization of Barahama Sali, which led to the eventual release from captivity of Catholic priest Fr. Cirilo Nacorda who had been kidnapped by the Abu Sayyaf in Basilan. He was also involved in the 2002 operation that killed Abu Sayyaf spokesperson Abu Sabaya.

2000 Philippines-MILF War

In 2000 Querubin, now a lieutenant colonel, was conferred the Armed Forces of the Philippines' highest honor, the Medal of Valor for leading a military operation against 300 Moro Islamic Liberation Front fighters in Lanao del Norte.

Medal of Valor citation

"For acts of conspicuous courage, gallantry and intrepidity above and beyond the call of duty as Commanding Officer, Marine Battalion Landing Team-1, Philippine Marine Corps, Philippine Navy during a 24-hour firefight against an estimated 300 fully armed men belonging to the separatists Moro Islamic Liberation Front at Bgy Inudaran, Kauswagan, Lanao del Norte from 18 to 19 March 2000. Tasked to capture the formidable MILF Camp John Mack (ABDULLATEF). Headquarters of the 303rd Brigade, 3rd Field Division of the MILF commanded by the notorious Abdul Rahman G Macapaar, alias Commander Bravo, LIEUTENANT COLONEL QUERUBIN spearheaded the 1st MBLT composed of 117 officers and men in this hazardous mission against the enemy, superior in numbers and mastery of the terrain, and believed responsible for the spate of bombings in Central Mindanao and the siege of and hostage-taking at Kauswagan, Lanao del Norte. On or about 181815H March 2000, while enroute to their objective, he and his men were subjected to heavy volume of fire by rebels from their well-entrenched dug outs, bunkers and trenches. Unable to maneuver due to darkness and intense devastating fires from both heavy and light machineguns, B-40 rockets, mortar and snipers, he nevertheless ordered his men to hold the line and directed the Special Operation Squad to close in on the enemy camp and pinpoint its location to the Marines battalion artillery supporting fires, and the V-300 and V-150 armored vehicles to dislodge the enemy from their heavily fortified bunkers. Unmindful of his own safety, LIEUTENANT COLONEL QUERUBIN continuously moved from one forward position to another, thus drawing enemy fires to his own location, purposely to pinpoint enemy targets for their artillery support fires. The battle which had raged continuously until the following day, did not deter him from rallying his men in repulsing wave after wave of enemy reinforcements and continued assaults in their attempt to encircle his unit. Despite dwindling ammunition and increasing casualties on their side, subject officer never lost his aggressive spirit as he continued to move around while urging and inspiring his men, including the wounded to continue. Under his inspiring leadership, his men fought ferociously forcing the enemy's last line of defense to collapse and sending them scampering to different directions along with their dead and wounded and leaving behind their vaunted rocket launchers and high powered firearms as well as documents of high intelligence value. The capture of Camp John Mack resulted in the neutralization of the MILF's most strategic staging area for operations and, more importantly, liberated the residents along the coastal municipalities of Lanao del Norte from the oppressive MILF revolutionary collection estimated at P 38M annually. By this gallant deed, LIEUTENANT COLONEL QUERUBIN distinguished himself in combat in the finest tradition of Filipino Soldiery."

2006 Fort Bonifacio standoff

On 24 February 2006, President Gloria Macapagal Arroyo issued a proclamation declaring a state of emergency in the Philippines after her government foiled a supposed coup plot called Oplan HACKLE. Fourteen junior military officers had been arrested two days before. In the wake of the proclamation, on 26 February 2006, Major General Renato Miranda, the Philippine Marine Corps Commandant, was relieved from his post. Colonel Querubin protested his removal and some Marines started a vigil at Fort Bonifacio. Querubin stated that they would wait there for the people to protect them. Meanwhile, other government security forces loyal to Arroyo locked down Fort Bonifacio, sealing in the protesting Marines. The standoff was resolved that evening. Querubin was detained at Camp Aguinaldo and recommended to undergo pretrial investigation and facing a mutiny charge.

In 2010, President Benigno Aquino III issued Proclamation No. 50, granting amnesty to military personnel linked to the 2003 Oakwood mutiny, the 2006 Fort Bonifacio standoff and the 2007 Manila Peninsula siege.

Post-military service
Querubin worked as an internal security consultant for San Miguel Corporation after being granted amnesty. He resigned his commission from the Armed Forces of the Philippines when he ran for a Senate seat as a member of the Nacionalista Party during the 2010 elections. His candidacy was not successful, only garnering 6.5 million votes and landing him in 19th place in the senatorial race. He supported Grace Poe's candidacy during the 2016 Presidential election.

Personal life
Querubin has five children. His first wife, Dr. Loreta Cercenia-Querubin, bore him two - Alfred Benjamin and Francesca Eufrosina. She died in 1994 at the age of 31, allegedly over stress stemming from a business deal with Janet Lim-Napoles, the alleged mastermind of the Priority Development Assistance Fund scam. Querubin has remarried; his second wife is Pong Azcarraga Querubin, who bore him three children, Jose Ariel, Ariel, and John Ariel.

See also
Custodio Parcon

References

Armed Forces of the Philippines Medal of Valor
Recipients of the Philippine Medal of Valor
Philippine Marine Corps personnel